The Rural Municipality of Bifrost is a former rural municipality (RM) in the Canadian province of Manitoba. It was originally incorporated as a rural municipality on December 1, 1907. It ceased on January 1, 2015 as a result of its provincially mandated amalgamation with the Village of Riverton to form the Municipality of Bifrost – Riverton.

It was located in Manitoba's Interlake Region along the west shore of Lake Winnipeg. It had a population of about 2,750. Its name comes from a Scandinavian word from Norse mythology meaning "rainbow bridge connecting Asgard and Midgard" (Earth).

Geography 
The RM of Bifrost included the communities of Morweena, Vidir and Hnausa. The independently governed Town of Arborg and the former Village of Riverton were within the boundaries of the RM of Bifrost. The RM also contains part of Manitoba's Moose Creek Provincial Forest.

Communities 
 Finns
 Geysir
 Hnausa
 Jaroslaw
 Ledwyn
 Morweena
 Okno
 Rosenburg
 Shorncliffe
 Vidir
 Washow Bay

History 

In 1875, the Canadian Government set aside a portion of land on the west shore of Lake Winnipeg, which was called New Iceland and was inhabited by over 1200 Icelandic settlers. This area was considered the R.M. of Gimli, but it was decided that the municipality be split up, because of the poor condition of the roads that made travel too difficult to get to the government offices. In 1907, the R.M. of Gimli was split up and the northwestern part became known as Bifrost, and then the R.M. of Bifrost in 1908. Bifrost is a Scandinavian word that means "rainbow bridge connecting heaven and earth". The municipal offices for Bifrost were set up in Hnausa, but in 1916 the offices moved to the Town of Arborg.

Notable people 
Professional Toronto Maple Leafs ice hockey goaltender James Reimer grew up in Morweena.

In popular culture
In the 2014 film, Tusk, the protagonist travels to Bifrost to interview a man for his podcast.

References 

 Manitoba Historical Society - Rural Municipality of Bifrost
Map of Bifrost R.M. at Statcan

External links 
 

Bifrost
Populated places disestablished in 2015
2015 disestablishments in Manitoba